Susan Hamilton (born 1970) is a Scottish soprano focusing on Baroque and Contemporary music 

Her earliest musical education was as a chorister at St Mary's Episcopal Cathedral and as a pupil at St Mary's Music School in  Edinburgh.

Susan performs at major international festivals  and has worked with conductors such as Sir John Eliot Gardiner, Philippe Herreweghe, Paul McCreesh, Raphael Frühbeck de Burgos and Ton Koopman; Composers such as Fabian Fiorini, Ronald Stevenson, Pascal Dusapin, Witold Lutoslawski and Peter Nelson.  Along with Ben Parry she was co-founder and formerly artistic director of the Dunedin Consort.

References

Living people
1970 births
Scottish sopranos
People educated at St Mary's Music School
Place of birth missing (living people)
Musicians from Edinburgh
21st-century Scottish women singers